Jordanoff Bay is the 5 km wide bay indenting for 4.9 km Davis Coast in Graham Land on the Antarctic Peninsula, and entered northeast of Wennersgaard Point and southwest of Tarakchiev Point.  Its head is fed by Sabine Glacier.

The bay is named for the Bulgarian-American pioneer of aviation Assen Jordanoff (1896–1967) who built the first Bulgarian engine-powered airplane in 1915 and took part in the construction of B-17 Flying Fortress and other US planes.

Location
German-British mapping in 1996.

Maps
 Trinity Peninsula. Scale 1:250000 topographic map No. 5697. Institut für Angewandte Geodäsie and British Antarctic Survey, 1996
 Antarctic Digital Database (ADD). Scale 1:250000 topographic map of Antarctica. Scientific Committee on Antarctic Research (SCAR). Since 1993, regularly upgraded and updated

Notes

References
 Jordanoff Bay. SCAR Composite Gazetteer of Antarctica
 Bulgarian Antarctic Gazetteer. Antarctic Place-names Commission. (details in Bulgarian, basic data in English)

External links
 Jordanoff Bay. Copernix satellite image

Bays of Graham Land
Bulgaria and the Antarctic
Davis Coast